Martin Andi Drito is an economist, businessman, entrepreneur and politician in Uganda, the third-largest economy in the East African Community. He is the current managing director and chief executive officer of Drito Global Corporation Limited, a mining and logging company that he founded and owns. He also serves as the elected member of parliament for Madi-Okollo County, Arua District, a position to which he was elected in 2011 though he later lost his parliamentary seat in the 2016 parliamentary elections.  In 2007, he was reported to be one of the wealthiest individuals in Uganda.

Background and education
He was born in Arua, on 15 June 1957. He attended Ezuku Primary School, from 1963 until 1969. He transferred to Old Kampala Secondary School for his O-Level studies, from 1970 through 1973. He entered Namilyango College in 1974, completing his A-Level studies at the College, in 1975. In 1987, he obtained the degree of Bachelor of Science (BSc) in Applied Economics. In 2010, he obtained the degree of Master of Business Administration (MBA), from the University of Conakry, in Guinea, West Africa.

Career
In 1992, Martin Andi Drito established two companies: (a) Drito Global Corporation and (b) Nile Trading Corporation. The two businesses are involved in mining, mineral processing, timber development and logging. He is the managing director and CEO of both companies, which maintain offices at Workers House, on Pilkington Road, in Kampala's central business district. From 1998 until 2004, Martin Drito served as an Advisor to the President of Guinea on mineral policy and implementation. In 2011, he successfully ran for the parliamentary constituency of Madi-Okollo County, in Arua District, and is the incumbent MP.

Other considerations
Between 2011 and 2016, he was a member of the Parliament of Uganda, and sat on the Committee on Natural Resources and on the Committee on Budget. He later lost his parliamentary seat in the 2016 parliamentary elections.

See also
Parliament of Uganda
List of African millionaires
List of wealthiest people in Uganda

References

External links
 Website of Uganda's Parliament

Living people
1957 births
Ugandan businesspeople
People from Arua District
Lugbara people
Ugandan economists
Gamal Abdel Nasser University of Conakry alumni
Alumni of the University of East London
People educated at Namilyango College